Kotovsky is a rural locality (a khutor) and the administrative center of Kotovskoye Rural Settlement, Uryupinsky District, Volgograd Oblast, Russia. The population was 953 as of 2010. There are 19 streets.

Geography 
Kotovsky is located in steppe, 15 km northwest of Uryupinsk (the district's administrative centre) by road. Popov is the nearest rural locality.

References 

Rural localities in Uryupinsky District